Rio 2 is a 2014 American 3D computer-animated musical comedy film produced by Blue Sky Studios and directed by Carlos Saldanha. It is the sequel to the 2011 computer-animated film Rio and the second installment of the Rio franchise. The title refers to the Brazilian city of Rio de Janeiro, where the first film was set and Rio 2 begins, though most of its plot occurs in the Amazon rainforest. The film stars Jesse Eisenberg, Anne Hathaway, will.i.am, Jamie Foxx, George Lopez, Tracy Morgan, Jemaine Clement, Leslie Mann, Rodrigo Santoro, and Jake T. Austin reprising their roles from the first film with new members including Bruno Mars, Andy Garcia, Rita Moreno, Rachel Crow, Kristin Chenoweth, Amandla Stenberg, Pierce Gagnon, and Miguel Ferrer (in his final theatrical film before his death in 2017).

Rio 2 was released internationally on March 20, 2014, and on April 11, 2014, in American theaters by 20th Century Fox. It grossed $498 million worldwide, against a production budget of $103 million, and received mixed reviews from critics, garnering praise for the animation, voice acting and songs, but criticism for the story and writing. The film is dedicated to the memory of screenwriter Don Rhymer, who died on November 28, 2012. This was Blue Sky Studios' first and only follow-up film outside the Ice Age franchise. This was also the final Rio film to be produced by Blue Sky Studios before its closure on April 10, 2021. A third film is in development.

Plot

Three years after the events of the first film,  Blu and Jewel are raising their three children — Carla, Bia, and Tiago — in the city but Jewel is disappointed to see her children becoming too domesticated like their father. Meanwhile, Linda and Tulio are on an expedition in the Amazon and, after a fall down a waterfall, discover a Spix's macaw that loses one of its feathers. When words about the encounter were broadcast through television, Jewel believes that they should go to the Amazon to help find the blue macaws. While the kids are ecstatic, Blu is uncertain, but he is pressured into going along. Rafael, Nico and Pedro also decide to come along to scout talent for Carnival. Luiz tries to follow, but is unknowingly left behind by the birds. Blu brings a fanny pack full of supplies, including a GPS, much to Jewel's chagrin.

Big Boss, the leader of a group of illegal loggers, discovers Linda and Tulio's expedition to find the macaws and orders his henchmen to hunt them down. At the same time, Nigel plots to exact revenge on Blu along with his new comrades, an anteater named Charlie and a poison dart frog named Gabi. After they arrive at the jungle, Blu, his family, and their friends initially find nothing. However, they are eventually taken to a flock of blue macaws that are hiding in an uncharted section of the Amazon. There, Jewel is reunited with her long-lost father, Eduardo, paternal aunt Mimi, and childhood friend, Roberto. Eduardo seems unimpressed with Blu, but thanks him for bringing Jewel back home. Having lost their previous habitat to arson from the illegal loggers Eduardo is anti-human, and  brushes off Blu's suggestion to expose the sanctuary to Linda and Tulio to ensure their protection.

While searching for the macaws, Linda and Tulio are eventually captured by the loggers. Meanwhile, Blu does his best to fit in with the flock, as his family are doing, but his continued reliance on human tools prevent him from connecting with anyone. Meanwhile, in another attempt to get closer to Blu, a disguised Nigel wins a talent show to become a performer for a Carnival show that Rafael, Pedro, Nico and Carla are hosting. When Blu tries to pick a Brazilian nut for Jewel, he accidentally tries to get it in the territory of the Spix macaw's enemies, the scarlet macaws, led by the hostile Felipe. Blu inadvertently causes war between the two tribes for food when he accidentally swats Felipe with a branch. The war turns out to be a football (soccer) match, but Blu accidentally costs the flock their territory when he scores on his team's own goal.

After an argument with Jewel, Blu ultimately decides that he will leave Linda and his human roots behind him for the sake of his family, but when he witnesses the loggers’ destruction of the forest, he returns to the flock and rallies them, finally gaining Eduardo's trust. With Blu's knowledge of human technology and help from the scarlet macaws, the flock disable the loggers' machinery. During the fight, Eduardo flies into a tractor and gets knocked onto the ground. As the tractor attempts to kill him, Linda tackles the machine in another tractor and wins. As Eduardo is on the ground between the tractors, Tulio picks him up and lets him fly away. Big Boss tries blowing up the trees with dynamite instead, but Blu thwarts him. Big Boss tries to stop Blu, but Nigel intervenes, wanting Blu to himself, leaving Big Boss to encounter an anaconda. Nigel then attacks Blu in a final attempt to get revenge, but Gabi, while trying to help, accidentally knocks Nigel out with a porcupine's quill filled with her poison. However, Bia reveals that Gabi isn't a poison dart frog at all, but a species of tree frog, and an overjoyed Gabi lovingly smothers a dismayed Nigel and drags him away, while Charlie leaves. The anaconda is shown with a bloated belly, wearing Big Boss’s hat and spitting out his signature lollipop.

With the flock now under Linda and Tulio's protection, Blu and Jewel decide to live in the Amazon with their kids, though still agreeing to visit Rio in the summer. Eduardo drops his anti-human stance by wearing a fanny pack of his own, and accepts Blu into the flock. Nigel and Gabi are sent to Rio for study, Nico and Pedro's Carnival show called Amazon Untamed goes on, and Luiz arrives at the Amazon for a visit.

Voice cast

 Jesse Eisenberg as Blu, a male Spix's macaw from Moose Lake who was born in Rio de Janeiro and Jewel's mate.
 Anne Hathaway as Jewel, a female Spix's macaw from Rio de Janeiro and Blu's mate.
 Jemaine Clement as Nigel, a sadistic sulphur-crested cockatoo and Gabi's love interest who seeks revenge on Blu for crippling his ability to fly.
 Kristin Chenoweth as Gabi, a poison dart frog who is Nigel's sidekick. In the end of the film, she is revealed to be a tree frog. 
 will.i.am as Pedro, a rapping red-crested cardinal.
 George Lopez as Rafael, a romantic, wise and energetic toco toucan who is fond of the Rio Carnival and Eva's mate.
 Bruno Mars as Roberto, Jewel's suave childhood friend.
 Leslie Mann as Linda, an American woman who adopted Blu for 15 years and Tulio's wife.
 Rodrigo Santoro as Tulio, a Brazilian ornithologist and Linda's husband.
 Rita Moreno as Aunt Mimi, Eduardo's sister and Jewel's aunt.
 Tracy Morgan as Luiz, a bulldog and a chainsaw expert with a drooling condition.
 Jake T. Austin as Fernando, Linda and Tulio's adopted son.
 Andy Garcia as Eduardo, Jewel's father.
 Jamie Foxx as Nico, a smooth and charismatic yellow canary that wears a bottle-cap hat, close friend to Pedro.
 Rachel Crow as Carla, Blu and Jewel's music-loving daughter and the oldest of Blu and Jewel's children.
 Pierce Gagnon as Tiago, Blu and Jewel's youngest, mischievous, and only son.
 Amandla Stenberg as Bia, Blu and Jewel's intelligent, younger daughter, the middle child.
 Miguel Ferrer as Big Boss, the head of the illegal logging activity.
 Janelle Monáe as Dr. Monae, a veterinarian This was also Janelle Monae's first film role.
 Natalie Morales as a news anchor.
 Bebel Gilberto as Eva, a keel-billed toucan and Rafael's mate.
 Philip Lawrence as Felipe, a male scarlet macaw and the hostile leader of a tribe who has a rivalry and territorial dispute with the Spix's macaws.

Production
On January 25, 2012, while speaking to the Associated Press, Sérgio Mendes who co-wrote a song for the first film spoke about the sequel, saying: "I think the plan is for the movie to come three or four months before the World Cup. Fox has been talking about (it) and it looks like it's going to happen. We're going to have a meeting I think next week and Carlos is coming to town to tell us the story, and it looks like it's a go." In April 2012, Deadline Hollywood reported that Jesse Eisenberg had signed up to reprise his role as Blu, and Anne Hathaway had also signed on to reprise her role as Jewel. In October 2012, Variety stated that Carlos Saldanha had officially signed a five-year deal with 20th Century Fox that allows him to helm live-action and/or animated films, with the sequel being part of that contractual agreement.

Screenwriter Don Rhymer died on November 28, 2012 from complications relating to his head and neck cancer positive diagnosis, during the writing phase of the sequel. In January 2013, Rodrigo Santoro confirmed his return to voice ornithologist Tulio Monteiro, as well as hinting that the sequel's setting will involve the Amazon. 20th Century Fox and Blue Sky unveiled the first teaser trailer at the annual Las Vegas, Nevada CinemaCon on April 18, 2013. On May 14, 2013, that same trailer was released online worldwide, and attached with Epic. Entertainer Bruno Mars joined the cast as Roberto after director Carlos Saldanha caught his performance on Saturday Night Live. During production, Mars offered his own personal touches that better shaped his character's physical appearance, personality, and voice.

Release

Rio 2 was released to international theaters on March 20, 2014. The film's premiere was held in Miami, Florida on March 20, 2014. The film was released theatrically in the United States on April 11, 2014.

The film's theatrical release was preceded by Almost Home, a short film produced by DreamWorks Animation to promote their 2015 film Home (20th Century Fox handled distribution for DWA's films at the time of its release).

Marketing
Under the supervision of 20th Century Fox—with director Carlos Saldanha and music composer John Powell—the film's natural hometown of Rio de Janeiro, Brazil used the film as a tie-in promotion for the 2014 New Year's Eve celebration at Copacabana Beach.

Three of four Angry Birds Rio episodes — all visually tied to Rio 2 — have been released. The first, "Rocket Rumble", was released in December 2013, the second, "High Dive", in February 2014, and the third, "Blossom River", in April 2014. In April 2014, Kohl's began selling Blu, Gabi, and Luiz plush toys as a part of their Kohl's Cares merchandise program.

The film also had promotional backing from Burger King, General Mills, Liberty Travel and ConAgra Foods.

Home media
Rio 2 was released on Blu-ray (2D and 3D) and DVD on July 15, 2014. The Target exclusive comes with a Blu plush toy. A limited sing-along edition of the film was released on Blu-ray and DVD on November 4, 2014.

Reception

Critical response
The site's critical consensus reads, "Like most sequels, Rio 2 takes its predecessor's basic template and tries to make it bigger -- which means it's even busier, more colorful, and ultimately more exhausting for viewers outside the youthful target demographic." On Metacritic, the film has a score of 49 out of 100 based on 34 critics, indicating "mixed or average reviews". Audiences polled by CinemaScore gave the film an average grade of "A" on an A+ to F scale, the same grade earned by its predecessor.

Mark Adams of Screen Daily said, "As a delightfully bright and breezy bit of 3D animated entertainment Rio 2 hits the sweet spot, and will no doubt be a box office hit with its blend of good-natured jungle adventure, songs and gags. The only frustrating thing is that it feels very much like a by-the-numbers sequel, lacking the verve, ebullience and left-field humour that made 2011’s Rio such a surprise hit." Justin Lowe of The Hollywood Reporter said, "This rumble in the jungle adds a colorful cast of rain-forest creatures to the franchise's infectious sense of frivolity." Justin Chang of Variety said, "Domestic and ecological dramas abound in this bright, noisy, overstuffed sequel to Fox's 2011 surprise hit." Tom Huddleston of Time Out gave the film three out of five stars, saying "There are problems here ... but the characterisation is feisty and memorable, the song-and-dance sequences intricate and colourful, and it'll charm the socks off little people." Claudia Puig of USA Today gave the film two out of four stars, saying "Rio 2 teems with colorful animated splendor and elaborate musical numbers, but its rambling, hectic, if good-hearted, story is for the birds." Richard Corliss of Time gave the film a positive review, saying "Even when it's coarse and calculating, this is an eager entertainment machine that will keep the kids satisfied. Just don't tell them that the Rio movies are musical comedies about an avian genocide."

Elizabeth Weitzman of the New York Daily News gave the film three out of five stars, saying "We're grading on a sliding scale here. But if Rio 2 is hardly Pixar quality, it's certainly better than the average animated sequel." Peter Hartlaub of the San Francisco Chronicle gave the film two out of four stars, saying "It's like the last Hobbit movie - so much time passes between side plots that you have to jog the memory when a minor character appears again. Who's that toucan again? Is he a bad guy?" Bill Goodykoontz of The Arizona Republic gave the film three out of four stars, saying "An agreeable song-and-dance movie, a laugh here, a laugh there, pleasant but overly busy, for seemingly no real reason other than to throw a few more set pieces at the wall to see what sticks." Jessica Herndon of the Associated Press gave the film three out of four stars, saying "With so much going on, it's a wonder this kids' movie is only five minutes longer than the original. But for the music and brilliantly picturesque look, it's worth the 3-D ticket." Stephanie Merry of The Washington Post gave the film two out of four stars, saying "All in all, though, the movie feels at once too busy and too derivative. That's no easy feat, but it's also one sequel-makers probably shouldn't aspire to." Bruce Demara of the Toronto Star gave the film two and a half stars out of four, saying "Those who enjoyed the adventures of Blu and Jewel and company in the first Rio are going to find the sequel an equally pleasing diversion."

Tom Russo of The Boston Globe gave the film two out of four stars, saying "The story flows, but not always freely, thanks to its manufactured feel." Jeannette Catsoulis of The New York Times gave the film a negative review, saying "The cinematic equivalent of attack by kaleidoscope, Rio 2 sucks you in and whirls you around before spitting you out, exhausted." Betsy Sharkey of the Los Angeles Times gave the film a negative review, saying "Wonderfully animated and well-voiced, Rio 2 is nevertheless too much. Too much plot, too many issues, too many characters." Bill Zwecker of the Chicago Sun-Times gave the film three out of four stars, saying "It's as good as the first one and sure to please both the kiddies and adults with its two-tiered humor." Tirdad Derakhshani of The Philadelphia Inquirer gave the film two out of four stars, saying "It'll keep the kids content for a couple of hours, though it's likely to bore the grown-ups." Liam Lacey of The Globe and Mail gave the film three out of four stars, saying "Rio 2 (like Fox’s Ice Age series) relies on derivative plotting and slapstick visual gags, in contrast to Pixar’s more cerebral originality. Where the film excels though, in an even more pronounced way than the first film, is in the choreographed animation for the musical numbers." Alonso Duralde of The Wrap gave the film a negative review, saying "The musical moments, on the whole, stand out as the highlights of the film; Rio 2 becomes watchable when the flat characters shut up and sing."

Rafer Guzman of Newsday gave the film one and a half stars out of four, saying "The movie has one goal: to amuse the most children with the least amount of effort." Steve Persall of the Tampa Bay Times gave the film a B+, saying "Like its peppy predecessor, Rio 2 doesn't look or sound like other animated licenses to print money. That alone is reason enough to appreciate it." Kevin McFarland of The A.V. Club gave the film a C, saying "Like the first film, Rio 2 is almost oppressively bright, bombarding the screen with flashes of saturated rainforest colors and even a bird version of soccer (timed a bit too perfectly to the 2014 World Cup in Brazil)." Mike McCahill of The Guardian gave the film two out of five stars, saying "It's hard to ascribe much art or wit to a franchise that retains the services of will.i.am as comic relief – and a thoroughly inorganic talent-show subplot feels like another attempt to groom youngsters for life in the Cowell jungle." Robbie Collin of The Daily Telegraph gave the film two out of five stars, saying "This jumbled sequel, which was also directed by Carlos Saldanha, loses most of what made the first film such an infectious entertainment." Eric Henderson of Slant Magazine gave the film one out of five stars, saying "Though there isn't a fruit-flavored hue that isn't jammed into every single corner of screen space in Rio 2, the movie has less actual nutritional value than 10 bowls of crushed Froot Loops dust. 20th Century Fox's sequel to the already dubious 2011 film would seem far too endlessly hyperventilating and self-stimulating a way to keep kids from barreling toward a spaz attack on a Saturday afternoon."

Box office
Rio 2 grossed $131.5 million in North America, and $367.2 million in other territories, for a worldwide total of $498.8 million surpassing its predecessor. In North America, the film earned $12 million on its opening day, and opened to number two in its first weekend, with $39.3 million, behind Captain America: The Winter Soldier. In its second weekend, the film dropped to number three, grossing an additional $22.2 million. In its third weekend, the film remained number three, grossing $13.9 million. In its fourth weekend, the film dropped to number five, grossing $7.7 million. Twentieth Century Fox Home Entertainment donated $100,000 to WWF to support conservation efforts in the Amazon.

Accolades

Music

The soundtrack to Rio 2 also consisted of collaborations from Brazilian and American artists, and Brazilian musician Sérgio Mendes, would co-produce the album with the film's composer John Powell, after previously doing so for the first film's soundtrack. The soundtrack titled Rio 2 (Music from the Motion Picture) was released on March 25, 2014, by Atlantic Records. It was promoted by the single "What Is Love", performed by Janelle Monáe, released as a single from the album on March 4. Powell's score was released into a separate album on April 15, 2014. The Barbatuques performed the song "Beautiful Creatures" as part of the closing ceremony of the 2016 Summer Olympics in Rio de Janeiro.

Future

Sequel 
Director Carlos Saldanha had kept the possibility for Rio 3 open. In April 2014, he stated, "Of course, I have a lot of stories to tell, so we're [starting to] prepare for it.". In January 2022, after the acquisition of 20th Century Fox by Disney, it was announced that a third Rio film is officially in development, with Jim Hecht writing the screenplay.

Spin-off
On October 25, 2019, after the acquisition of 21st Century Fox by Disney, it was announced that a spin-off that centered on Nico and Pedro is in development for Disney+. The status of this spin-off has been left uncertain since.

References

External links

 
 

2014 films
2014 3D films
2014 computer-animated films
2010s adventure films
2010s American animated films
2010s children's comedy films
2010s children's animated films
2014 fantasy films
2010s musical films
American children's animated adventure films
American children's animated comedy films
American children's animated fantasy films
American children's animated musical films
American computer-animated films
American sequel films
Animated films about birds
2010s children's fantasy films
Blue Sky Studios films
Fictional parrots
Films scored by John Powell
Films about animal rights
Films directed by Carlos Saldanha
Films set in Brazil
Films set in jungles
Films set in the Amazon
Films set in Rio de Janeiro (city)
Films set in South America
3D animated films
20th Century Fox films
20th Century Fox animated films
20th Century Fox Animation films
2014 comedy films
Rio (franchise)
2010s English-language films